The Tupolev Tu-330 was a proposed Russian medium-size transport aircraft developed by Tupolev since the early 1990s. The project was stopped around 2000s due to lack of funding and difficult economic situation of the Russian aircraft industry at the time.

Design 
The Tu-330 was to have a swept high-mounted wing design with two high-bypass ratio PS-90A engines mounted below the wings. An optional powerplant system has also been proposed, using NK-93 engines that can operate on LNG (liquefied natural gas) fuel. The aircraft was also designed for commonality with the Tu-204/Tu-214 civilian airliner series, in order to simplify production and minimize costs of manufacturing, maintenance and parts.

Variants
In addition to Tu-330, the following variants were proposed:

Tu-330 Basic civilian cargo variant.
Tu-330PS Search and rescue variant.
Tu-330P Firefighting variant.
Tu-330RL A variant designed for long-range reconnaissance flights.
Tu-330R Communication relay aircraft.
Tu-330VT Strategic/Tactical airlifter.
Tu-330SE Sanitary and evacuation aircraft.
Tu-330TZ Aerial refueling tanker.
Tu-330K (Tu-338) A proposed liquid natural gas-fuelled variant with a Samara NK-94 engine.

Specifications

References

Notes

Bibliography

External links

 Information on the Tu-330, from Tupolev
 http://www.globalsecurity.org/military/world/russia/tu-330.htm

Proposed aircraft of Russia
Tu-0330
Tu-0330
Tu-0330